Mamai may refer to:
Mamai, a powerful military commander of the Blue Horde in the 14th century
Mamai, Armenia
Mamai, Iran, a village in Golestan Province, Iran
 Cossack Mamay
Mamai, Shusha, Azerbaijan one of seventeen quarters in Shusha town, Azerbaijan